Fayçal Badji (born February 15, 1974, in Algiers) is a retired Algerian international football player. He spent the majority of his playing career in Algeria, with a brief spell with Erzurumspor in the Turkish Super Lig. He is currently the general manager of MC Alger.

Honours

Club
CR Belouizdad
Algerian Championnat National (2): 1999-00, 2000–01

MC Alger
Algerian Championnat National (1): 2008-09
Algerian Cup (2): 2005-06, 2006–07
Algerian Super Cup (2): 2006, 2007

Individual
 Chosen twice as the Best Player in the Algerian League in 2000/2001 and 2003/2004 by sports daily Competition

References

External links

1974 births
2000 African Cup of Nations players
Algeria international footballers
Algerian expatriate footballers
Algerian expatriate sportspeople in Turkey
Algerian footballers
CR Belouizdad players
CS Constantine players
Erzurumspor footballers
Expatriate footballers in Turkey
Living people
MC Alger players
Footballers from Algiers
Süper Lig players
USM El Harrach players
Association football midfielders
21st-century Algerian people